The Berks & Bucks FA County Senior Cup is the Senior County Cup competition of the Berks & Bucks FA and was first played in 1878/79; a time when the FA Cup had only been going for seven years, there was no Football League, and most countries in the world did not have any competitions at all.

Originally known as the Berks & Bucks Challenge Cup, the competition was played in the first season of the Association's existence, and Reading were the inaugural winners, defeating Marlow 1–0 in the final held at the Reading Cricket Ground.

The competition consists of mainly non-league teams; however, Wycombe Wanderers, Milton Keynes Dons and Reading are three Football League teams who have recently competed, often fielding reserve and youth team players.

In 2022, Reading defeated Ascot United 4–0 in the final at Arbour Park, Slough.

Past seasons

2018–19 season

2019–20 season

2021–22 season

Current season

First round qualifying

Second round qualifying

First round

Second round

Quarter-final

Semi-finals

Final

Recent finals

Wins by team
Teams shown in italics are no longer in existence.

The total for Maidenhead United includes three wins as Maidenhead FC.

Slough Town have won the cup under four different club names, the others being Swifts FC, Slough FC, and Slough Centre FC.

11 teams have won the competition on one occasion, including Maidenhead Norfolkians, Abingdon Town, Hungerford Town and Milton Keynes Dons.

See also 
In addition to the BBFA County Senior Cup, the Berks & Bucks FA also run the following competitions, which are also often referred to as the "Berks & Bucks FA County Cup":

 BBFA County Senior Trophy
 BBFA County Intermediate Cup
 BBFA County Junior Cup
 BBFA County Sunday Intermediate Cup
 BBFA County Sunday Junior Cup
 BBFA County Sunday Junior Trophy
 BBFA County Women's Senior Cup
 BBFA County Women's Trophy
 BBFA County Girls Cup (Under 14)
 BBFA County Girls Cup (Under 16)
 BBFA County Girls Cup (Under 18)
 BBFA County Minor Cup (Under 12)
 BBFA County Minor Cup (Under 13)
 BBFA County Minor Cup (Under 14)
 BBFA County Minor Cup (Under 15)
 BBFA County Minor Cup (Under 16)
 BBFA County Youth Cup

References

External links 
 Official website of the Berks & Bucks FA
 Official website of the Berks & Bucks FA, County Cups page

County Cup competitions
Football in Berkshire
Football in Buckinghamshire
Recurring sporting events established in 1878